Tambach-Dietharz is a town in the district of Gotha, in Thuringia, Germany. It is situated in the Thuringian Forest, 19 km south of Gotha.

Mayor
Since 2012, Marco Schütz (independent) is the mayor. His predecessor was the former lieutenant from the German Army (Bundeswehr) Harald Wrona (FDP).

Places of interest 
 The Falkenstein is a 96 m high, free standing porphyry rock. It is a natural monument and hiking destination. The mountain rescue hut at its foot is managed.
 The route from Schmalkalden to Tambach-Dietharz is signposted as Martin-Luther-Weg and is a walking route.

 In the autumn of 1989, a monument to the Swiss Theologian, and protagonist of the Bekennenden Kirche, Karl Barth was raised in front of the Haus Tannenberg. Barth gave his "Tambacher Rede" speech, that introduced a new positioning of protestant Christianity in the 20th century, in this house in 1919.

Notable people
 Meister Eckhart (born about 1260; died before April 30, 1328), theologian, mystic and philosopher
 Karl-Heinz Menz (born 1949), biathlete
 Matthias Jacob (born 1960), biathlete
 Erich Recknagel (1904-1973), ski jumper, participant in the Olympic Winter Games in 1928
 Eisregen (formed 1995), death metal band, all original members came from Tambach-Dietharz

References

Gotha (district)
Saxe-Coburg and Gotha